The phosphate sulfates are mixed anion compounds containing both phosphate and sulfate ions. 
Related compounds include the arsenate sulfates, phosphate selenates, and arsenate selenates.

Some hydrogen phosphate sulfates are superprotonic conductors.

List

Artificial

Organic derivatives 
A catenated sulfophosphate has the sulfur and phosphorus joined by an oxygen atom. In biochemistry, metabolism of sulfate may use such a group, for example with adenosine-5'-phosphosulfate.

References

Phosphates
Mixed anion compounds
Sulfates